Thomas Buchanan McGuire Jr. (August 1, 1920 – January 7, 1945) was an American United States Army major who was killed in action while serving as a member of the United States Army Air Forces during World War II and posthumously awarded the Medal of Honor. He was one of the most decorated American fighter pilots and the second highest scoring American ace of the war.

McGuire was memorialized by the renaming of Fort Dix Army Air Force Base in Burlington County, New Jersey, to McGuire Air Force Base in 1948.

Early years
McGuire was born in Ridgewood, New Jersey, on August 1, 1920. He and his mother moved to Sebring, Florida in the late 1920s and McGuire graduated from Sebring High School in 1938. He enrolled at the Georgia Institute of Technology to study aeronautical engineering, where he played in the marching band, was a sergeant major in the ROTC cadet corps, and became a member of Beta Theta Pi fraternity.  He left after his third year to enter the U.S. Army Air Corps Aviation Cadet Program on July 12, 1941.

United States Army Air Forces

McGuire would become one of the top scoring combat pilots in U.S. Air Force history. Civilian contractor Charles Lindbergh bunked with him for a time and flew as his wingman on several missions. Visitors recalled McGuire ordering Lindbergh around, telling him to run errands as though he were a servant. With a total of 38 enemy planes destroyed to his credit in World War II, McGuire was only two victories behind Major Richard Bong.

World War II
McGuire reported to the flying school in Corsicana, Texas, as an aviation cadet. He received further training in San Antonio, and was commissioned a second lieutenant and awarded his pilot wings at Kelly Field, Texas, on February 2, 1942. He was assigned to the 313th Pursuit Squadron at Selfridge Field, Michigan from February to May and the 56th Pursuit Squadron at Paine Field, Texas.

Combat missions

McGuire's first combat assignment was in June 1942, flying patrols over the Aleutian Islands in a Bell P-39 Airacobra while assigned to the 54th Fighter Group until October, before returning to Harding Field, Louisiana. While scoring no aerial victories in the Aleutians, McGuire was able to hone his skills as a pilot. In December 1942, he married Marilynn "Pudgy" Giesler shortly before he was transferred to Hamilton Field, California. In February 1943, he reported to Orange County Airport, California for transition training in the Lockheed P-38 Lightning.

In March 1943, McGuire was sent to the Southwest Pacific as a member of the 9th Fighter Squadron, 49th Fighter Group, Fifth Air Force, based in New Guinea. Two months later, the Fifth Air Force created an entire group of P-38s, the 475th Fighter Group in Australia at the behest of Lieutenant General George Kenney, the commanding officer of the Fifth Air Force. In mid-July, McGuire was transferred to the 431st Fighter Squadron, 475th Fighter Group. On August 18, 1943, Lieutenant McGuire was part of a group flying top cover for bombers striking at Wewak, New Guinea. Nearing their target, the fighters were attacked by Japanese aircraft. During the battle, McGuire shot down two Nakajima Ki-43 "Oscars" and one Kawasaki Ki-61 "Tony." On the following day, near the same location, he downed two more Oscars. This established him as an ace in two days. In September, he was promoted to first lieutenant.

McGuire's career nearly came to an end on October 17, 1943, when he scrambled from Dubodura, New Guinea to intercept approaching Japanese bombers being escorted by Mitsubishi A6M Zero fighters over Oro Bay, New Guinea. During the ensuing dogfight, McGuire observed at least seven Zeros attacking a lone P-38 that was trailing smoke. McGuire dove into the enemy fighters and quickly shot down three. The remaining four Zeros were able to attack McGuire and severely damage his aircraft. With his controls out, McGuire decided to bail out but as he exited the aircraft, his parachute harness snagged on something in the cockpit. From  McGuire struggled to free himself from the stricken fighter. He landed safely in the water and was rescued by a PT boat. McGuire suffered a  bullet wound to his wrist and numerous other injuries including some broken ribs. He spent six weeks in the hospital before he returned to his unit. For his actions on this day he was awarded a Silver Star and a Purple Heart. In late December, he was promoted to captain and became the operation officer of the 431st Fighter Squadron.

In early May 1944, McGuire became the commanding officer of the 431st Fighter Squadron. McGuire wrote a book, Combat Tactics In The Southwest Pacific Area, for Fifth Air Force on 4 May 1944. On May 18, he was promoted to major. In December, McGuire became the Operation Officer of the 475th Fighter Group. On December 25–26, 1944, he downed seven Japanese fighter aircraft in just two days over Luzon, Philippines.

Last mission and death

January 7, 1945, McGuire took off from Dulag Airfield on Leyte and led a group of four P-38s – himself, Major Jack Rittmayer, Captain Edwin Weaver, and Lieutenant Douglas Thropp – on a fighter sweep over northern Negros Island in the central Philippines. Their aim was to gain victories. McGuire desperately wanted to pass Bong's score of 40 kills. Descending through cloud cover, McGuire's flight circled a Japanese airfield at Fabrica and then proceeded to a second airstrip at Manapla (also referred to as Carolina). As they approached Manapla, they were confronted by a lone Ki-43 "Oscar", which immediately engaged McGuire's flight.

Flying in the number-three position, Lt. Thropp saw the Oscar trying to attack him in a head-on pass. Thropp broke hard left. The Japanese pilot turned with him and fell into position behind him while firing. Major Rittmayer, flying as Thropp's wingman, turned sharply towards and began firing on the attacker. McGuire saw the Oscar was being engaged by Rittmayer and turned to face an imminent threat to the flight from the opposite direction.  McGuire and his flight had encountered Warrant Officer Akira Sugimoto (杉本明, Sugimoto Akira), who was an instructor pilot with some 3,000+ hours in type. Sugimoto broke away from Thropp and Rittmayer and turned to find McGuire and his wingman Ed Weaver directly in front of him.  Sugimoto was easily able to catch up and attack them from behind.

As Sugimoto approached Weaver from behind, Weaver radioed he was attacked and cut inside of the turn to present a more difficult shot.  McGuire eased up on his turn rate in an effort to draw the attacker off of his wingman and onto himself. Sugimoto took the bait and switched his attack to McGuire.  As Sugimoto approached from behind, McGuire rapidly increased his turn rate. This extremely dangerous maneuver, performed at an altitude of only  (contrary to McGuire's own dictates never to engage at a low altitude), caused McGuire's P-38 to stall. It snap rolled inverted and nosed down into the ground. Despite the low altitude, McGuire nearly pulled out successfully; had he jettisoned his drop tanks at the start of the dogfight, he might have managed it. McGuire was killed on impact.

McGuire's crash was witnessed by Filipinos who immediately rushed to the scene and secured his body so it would not be captured. In 1949, his remains were recovered by the U.S. Army and returned to the United States. He was buried with full military honors at Arlington National Cemetery on May 17, 1950. A memorial was erected at McGuire's fatal crash site on Negros Island in 2007, placed by aviation archaeologist and former fighter pilot David Mason.

Military awards
McGuire's military decorations and awards include:

Medal of Honor citation
Rank and organization: Major, U.S. Army Air Forces, Fifth Air Force
Place and date: Over Luzon, Philippine Islands, December 25–26, 1944
Entered service at: Sebring, Florida
Birth: Ridgewood, New Jersey
G.O. No.: 24, March 7, 1946

Namings and other honors

 McGuire Air Force Base, New Jersey, January 1948. The base has a P-38 Lightning on static display and the C-17 and KC-10 aircraft flown by the 305 AMW and 514 AMW carry the image of a P-38 in the fin flash of each aircraft's vertical stabilizer.
 Major Thomas B. McGuire Medal of Honor Exhibit: National Museum of the United States Air Force, Wright-Patterson AFB, Ohio.
 National Aviation Hall of Fame, Dayton, Ohio
 Aviation Hall of Fame of New Jersey (Teterboro Airport)
 Georgia Aviation Hall of Fame
 National Medal of Honor Grove, Valley Forge, Pennsylvania
 Florida Medal of Honor Grove
 Georgia Tech Alumni Medal of Honor Garden
 United States and Canadian Military Service display of the Beta Museum at the Beta Theta Pi General Fraternity headquarters in Oxford, Ohio

See also
List of Medal of Honor recipients for World War II

References

Bibliography

 Berg, A. Scott. Lindbergh. New York: G.P. Putnam's Sons, 1998. .
 Martin, Charles A. The Last Great Ace: The Life of Major Thomas B. McGuire Jr. Jacksonville, Florida: Fruit Cove Publishing, 1999. .

External links

  Tommy McGuire at acesofww2.com
 McGuire Air Force Base Website fact sheet
 McGuire fact sheet from the National Museum of the USAF (includes MOH citation) 
 248th Hiko Sentai: A Japanese "Hard Luck" Fighter Unit {Copyrighted – for reference only}
 "The Last Great Ace" a book about The Life of Thomas B. McGuire written by Charles A. Martin
 "Wingman to the Aces:  LT Floyd Fulkerson: Ultimate Wingman" Flight Journal, December 2012

1920 births
1945 deaths
American people of Irish descent
American World War II flying aces
Aviators killed by being shot down
Aviators from New Jersey
Burials at Arlington National Cemetery
Georgia Tech alumni
Military personnel from New Jersey
National Aviation Hall of Fame inductees
People from Sebring, Florida
People from Ridgewood, New Jersey
Recipients of the Distinguished Flying Cross (United States)
Recipients of the Distinguished Service Cross (United States)
Recipients of the Silver Star
Recipients of the Air Medal
United States Army Air Forces Medal of Honor recipients
United States Army Air Forces officers
United States Army Air Forces personnel killed in World War II
United States Army Air Forces pilots of World War II
World War II recipients of the Medal of Honor